Pat Baldwin may refer to:

Pat Baldwin (basketball) (born 1972), American basketball coach and former player
Pat Baldwin (footballer) (born 1982), English footballer

See also
Patrick Baldwin Jr. (born 2002), American basketball player
Patrice Baldwin, British drama educator